Emmi may refer to:

People
Emmi (Australian singer), singer-songwriter and voice of Blind Pig
Emmi (Finnish singer), a Finnish singer-songwriter
Emmi Dölling (1906–1990), a Czechoslovak/German political activist and journalist
Emmi Welter (1887–1971), German politician

Institutions
Emmi AG, Swiss-based milk processor company
EMMI, European Money markets Institute, is in charge to publish the Euribor daily reference rate
EMMIs, enemies in the 2021 video game Metroid Dread

Abbreviations
Cyrix EMMI, Extended Multi-Media Instructions, an MMX extension